Roberto Mancinelli (born 29 January 1976 in Albano Laziale, Italy) is an Italian footballer. He plays as a goalkeeper. He is currently playing for Italian Lega Pro Prima Divisione team Benevento.

In July 2011 he was signed by Benevento in 1-year contract.

References

1976 births
Living people
People from Albano Laziale
Italian footballers
S.S. Lazio players
U.S. Catanzaro 1929 players
Association football goalkeepers
Footballers from Lazio
Sportspeople from the Metropolitan City of Rome Capital